Gabriel Andrew Dirac (13 March 1925 – 20 July 1984) was a Hungarian-British mathematician who mainly worked in graph theory. He served as Erasmus Smith's Professor of Mathematics at Trinity College Dublin from 1964 to 1966. In 1952, he gave a sufficient condition for a graph to contain a Hamiltonian circuit. The previous year, he conjectured that n points in the plane, not all collinear, must span at least  two-point lines, where  is the largest integer not exceeding . This conjecture was proven true when n is sufficiently large by Green and Tao in 2012.

Education
Dirac started his studies at St John's College, Cambridge in 1942, but in that same year the war saw him serving in the aircraft industry.  He received his MA in 1949, and moved to the University of London, getting his Ph.D. "On the Colouring of Graphs: Combinatorial topology of Linear Complexes" there under Richard Rado.

Career
Dirac's main academic positions were at the King's College London (1948-1954), University of Toronto (1952-1953), University of Vienna (1954-1958), University of Hamburg (1958-1963), Trinity College Dublin (Erasmus Smith's Professor of Mathematics, 1964-1966), University of Wales at Swansea (1967-1970), and Aarhus University (1970-1984).

Family
He was born Balázs Gábor in Budapest, to Richárd Balázs, a military officer and businessman, and Margit "Manci" Wigner (sister of Eugene Wigner).  When his mother married Paul Dirac in 1937, he and his sister resettled in England and were formally adopted, changing their family name to Dirac. He married Rosemari Dirac and they had four children together: Meike, Barbara, Holger and Annette.

See also
Dirac's theorem on Hamiltonian cycles
Dirac's theorem on chordal graphs
Dirac's theorem on cycles in -connected graphs

Notes

References
 L. Døvling Andersen, I. Tafteberg Jakobsen, C. Thomassen, B. Toft, and  P. Vestergaard (eds.), Graph Theory in Memory of G.A. Dirac, Annals of Discrete Mathematics, volume 41, North-Holland, 1989.  .

20th-century Hungarian mathematicians
Graph theorists
Alumni of St John's College, Cambridge
Alumni of the University of London
1925 births
1984 deaths
Hungarian Jews
Paul Dirac
Academic staff of Aarhus University
Academics of Trinity College Dublin